Enzo Gaggi (born 14 January 1998) is an Argentine professional footballer who plays as a midfielder for Greek Super League club Volos.

Career
Gaggi began his career with Atlético de Rafaela. He made his professional debut on 28 May 2017 during an Primera División match with Belgrano, which was the first of five league appearances for the club in 2016–17 as they were relegated to Primera B Nacional. Gaggi subsequently appeared fifteen times across the 2018–19 Primera B Nacional campaign. For 2019–20, Gaggi was loaned to Torneo Federal A with Central Norte. He scored four goals in fifteen appearances for them. He returned to Rafaela on 30 June 2020, amid a conflict with Central Norte over unpaid income.

Career statistics
.

References

External links

1998 births
Living people
People from Rafaela
Argentine footballers
Association football midfielders
Argentine Primera División players
Primera Nacional players
Torneo Federal A players
Atlético de Rafaela footballers
Central Norte players
Defensores de Belgrano footballers
Chaco For Ever footballers
Sportspeople from Santa Fe Province